Kerem Kanter (born 29 April 1995) is a Turkish professional basketball player for Akita Northern Happinets of the Japanese B.League. He played college basketball for Wisconsin–Green Bay and the Xavier Musketeers. Kanter is the younger brother of NBA player Enes Freedom.

Early life 
Kanter played one season at IMG Academy and averaged 17 points and nine rebounds per game. Despite receiving major college attention, he took a long time to decide whether to go to college or play in a professional league. When he finally opted for college, most rosters were filled and Wisconsin–Green Bay was one of the only schools that could take him.

College career 
As a freshman at Green Bay, Kanter played alongside Keifer Sykes. Kanter averaged 4.0 points and 2.3 rebounds off the bench as a sophomore. He helped the Phoenix to their first NCAA Tournament berth in 20 years, earning a 14 seed. As a junior, he posted 11.3 points and 6.3 rebounds per game. After the season, he declared for the NBA draft, but opted out before the deadline. Kanter decided to transfer to Xavier University under the NCAA's graduate transfer rule. In his graduate year, Kanter averaged 10.9 points and 4.5 rebounds per game. He helped the Musketeers to a 29–6 season, its first Big East regular-season title and a 1 seed in the NCAA Tournament. Kanter scored 24 points and grabbed five rebounds in the first round win versus Texas Southern.

Professional career 
After going undrafted in the 2018 NBA Draft, Kanter signed with JL Bourg Basket of the French league on 6 August 2018. He averaged 7.2 points per game. On 22 January 2019, Kanter signed with BC Dzūkija.

In July 2019, Kanter signed with Club Joventut Badalona. In November, he refused to travel to Turkey to play against Darussafaka due to fears of being arrested. Kanter averaged 6.8 points and 3.8 rebounds per game. He was released from the team on 6 July 2020.

On 4 September 2020, Kanter officially signed with Kolossos Rodou of the Greek Basket League.

On 24 August 2021, he has signed with Śląsk Wrocław of the PLK.

On June 11, 2022, he has signed with Akita Northern Happinets of the Japanese B.League.

National team career 
Kanter competed on the Turkish U-18 national team in 2013, helping lead the team to a gold medal at the FIBA Europe U-18 Championship in Latvia.

References

External links 
Xavier Musketeers bio
FIBA profile

1995 births
Living people
Akita Northern Happinets players
Green Bay Phoenix men's basketball players
Xavier Musketeers men's basketball players
Joventut Badalona players
Kolossos Rodou B.C. players
Liga ACB players
Power forwards (basketball)
Śląsk Wrocław basketball players
Sportspeople from Bursa
Turkish expatriate basketball people in the United States
Turkish expatriate sportspeople in France
Turkish expatriate sportspeople in Lithuania
Turkish men's basketball players